Lucihormetica is a South American genus of giant cockroaches from the family Blaberidae, collectively referred to as glowspot cockroaches. It has been anecdotally reported that the thoracic spots of males are bioluminescent, but detailed research has been unable to conclusively prove this, although evidence for autofluorescence exists. The genus includes both relatively common and rare species: For example, L. verrucosa is relatively common and sometimes kept in captivity, while eight of the remaining species (as well as an additional undescribed species) only are known from a single specimen each.

Species
12 species:
Lucihormetica amazonica
Lucihormetica cerdai
Lucihormetica fenestrata
Lucihormetica grossei
Lucihormetica interna
Lucihormetica luckae
Lucihormetica osunai
Lucihormetica seabrai
Lucihormetica subcincta
Lucihormetica tapurucuara
Lucihormetica verrucosa
Lucihormetica zomproi

References

Cockroach genera